Lachlan Renshaw (born 2 April 1987 in Sydney, Australia) is a middle-distance track and field athlete and is the 2010 Australian Champion over 800 metres. He was also the 2008 800 m national champion. He represented Australia at the 2008 Beijing Olympics, finishing sixth in his heat in a time of 1:49.19. In 2010 he competed in the 800 m at the Delhi Commonwealth Games, progressing through the rounds to the final, but was unable to start in the final due to injury.

Lachlan has also competed at the international level at the 2006 World Junior Championships (3rd in his semi-final), as well as the 2007 and 2009 World University Games, finishing fifth in the 800 m in the latter event. His personal best time for the 800 m is 1:45.73, for 1500 metres is 3:47.69, for the 400 metres is 47.33, and he also holds the Australian record for the 600 metres at 1:15.14.

Lachlan attended Sydney Grammar School and was a winner of the Open 800 m Championship event at the AAGPS Athletics Competition for four years running, setting the 800 m record of 1:50.63 in his final year of school. He was further a member of the 4 × 400 metres relay team which holds the AAGPS record.

Statistics

Personal bests

Major competition record

National titles
800 metres: 2008, 2010 (2)

References

1987 births
Living people
Australian male middle-distance runners
Athletes from Sydney
Athletes (track and field) at the 2008 Summer Olympics
Olympic athletes of Australia
People educated at Sydney Grammar School
Commonwealth Games competitors for Australia
Athletes (track and field) at the 2010 Commonwealth Games
Universiade medalists in athletics (track and field)
Universiade gold medalists for Australia
Medalists at the 2011 Summer Universiade